Hampton Loade is a hamlet in Shropshire, England along the Severn Valley. The ferry is responsible for Hampton Loade's name, as Loade is derived from lode, an old English word for ferry.

Hampton Loade station, on the preserved Severn Valley Railway, is actually located on the Hampton side of the river although the whole area is often known locally Hampton Loade due to the presence of the station.

There is an unusual bridge close to Hampton Loade: a small private roadway is suspended below two large waterpipe arches, used to pump water from the river to Chelmarsh Reservoir, by the South Staffordshire Water works.

The hamlet is also home to a satellite navigation error where the ferry is listed as a car ferry or a bridge on certain sat-nav systems; there are now road signs in place warning of the error on the approach to the hamlet.

The ferry has not been run recently (as of 2017) prompting speculation that it is permanently closed. This has not been confirmed by any reliable news sources but according to the Severn Valley Railway it has ceased operation.

Landslide of June 2007

On the night of 19 June 2007, the village of Hampton on the west bank suffered major damage as a result of a severe rainstorm. The one and only road into the village was washed away (BBC photo), and large sections of nearby Severn Valley Railway track subsided.

References

External links

Hampton Loade: Village and Ferry
Panoramas Views: Ferry across the Severn BBC

Bridges across the River Severn
Populated places on the River Severn
Villages in Shropshire